"Renuncio" (English: "I Quit") is a song by Spanish singer Ruth Lorenzo. It was released on 17 February 2015 as a digital download in Spain as the third single from her debut studio album Planeta Azul (2014). The song has peaked to number 48 on the Spanish Singles Chart.

Music video
A music video to accompany the release of "Renuncio" was first released onto YouTube on 13 February 2015 at a total length of four minutes and forty-six seconds.

Track listing

Chart performance

Weekly charts

Release history

References

2015 singles
2014 songs
Ruth Lorenzo songs